Wietse Zweitze Venema (born 1951) is a Dutch programmer and physicist best known for writing the Postfix email system. He also wrote TCP Wrapper and collaborated with Dan Farmer to produce the computer security tools SATAN and The Coroner's Toolkit.

Biography
He studied physics at the University of Groningen, continuing there to get a PhD in 1984 with the dissertation Left-right symmetry in nuclear beta decay. He spent 12 years at Eindhoven University as a systems architect in the Mathematics and Computer Science department, and spent part of this time writing tools for Electronic Data Interchange. Since emigrating to the U.S. in 1996 and until 2015, he has been working for the IBM Thomas J. Watson Research Center in New York State. On March 24, 2015, he announced he was leaving IBM for Google.

Awards
Awards Venema has received for his work:

 Security Summit Hall of Fame Award (July 1998)
 SAGE Outstanding Achievement Award (November 1999)
 NLUUG Award (November 2000)
 Sendmail Milter Innovation Award (November 2006)
 The 2008 Free Software Foundation Award for the Advancement of Free Software (March 2009)
 ISSA Hall of Fame Award (October 2012)

References

External links
 

Dutch computer scientists
20th-century Dutch physicists
1951 births
Living people
American computer scientists
People associated with computer security
Dutch emigrants to the United States 
Google employees
Academic staff of the Eindhoven University of Technology
University of Groningen alumni
21st-century Dutch scientists
Google people